The Wright State Raiders team is the NCAA Division 1 basketball team that represents  Wright State University in Dayton, Ohio. The school's team currently competes in the Horizon League. The Raiders are currently coached by Kari Hoffman. The Raiders play at the Wright State University Nutter Center in Fairborn, Ohio. The official capacity for basketball games is 10,400.

History
Wright State first sponsored women's basketball in 1973. In 1990 Wright State joined the North Star Conference, where they played until 1992 when the conference was effectively absorbed by the Mid-Continent Conference. In 1995 Wright State would move to the Midwestern Collegiate Conference. The conference changed its name to the Horizon League on June 4, 2001.

The team earned its first NCAA Tournament win in March 2021, upsetting the No. 4 Arkansas Razorbacks 66–62.

Retired numbers
Wright State has retired one jersey number in its history.

Facilities
The Wright State Raiders currently play their home games at the Wright State University Nutter Center (originally named Ervin J. Nutter Center). Ervin J. Nutter, donated $1.5 million to Wright State University in 1986. Funds from both the state of Ohio and the university contributed an additional $8 million to construction efforts which began in 1988. The Ervin J. Nutter Center Completed in 1990.

Coaches 
The Raiders have had 8 coaches in their 41-year history. Current coach Kari Hoffman was hired in 2021.

Current coaching staff

Seasons
WSU's records season by season during their Division II tenure.

WSU's records season by season since joining Division I in 1987.

Notes

Record vs. Horizon League opponents
 Cleveland State: 38–37
 Detroit: 28–28
 Green Bay: 5–63
 Milwaukee: 31–28
 Northern Kentucky: 10–12
 Oakland: 14–1
 UIC: 35–28
 IUPUI: 11–2
 Youngstown State: 35–26

NCAA Tournament history

NCAA Tournament seeding history
The 1982 NCAA Women's Division I Basketball Tournament was the first Women's Basketball Tournament held under the auspices of the NCAA.

Tournament championships
Wright State has 3 conference tournament championships. On March 16, 2014 they defeated Green Bay 88–69 to clinch their first Horizon League tournament championship. The Raiders claimed their second Horizon League tournament championship in 2019 when they defeated Green Bay 55–52. They claimed their third with a 53–41 victory over IUPUI on March 9, 2021.

Women's National Invitation Tournament
Wright State has appeared in 4 Women's National Invitation Tournament. Wright State's record is 1–4 in the Women's National Invitational Tournament.

Women's Basketball Invitational
Wright State has appeared in 2 Women's Basketball Invitational tournaments. Their record is 2–2

All-time statistical leaders

Career leaders

Single-season leaders

Single-game leaders

References

External links